The 1983 Temple Owls football team was an American football team that represented Temple University as an independent during the 1983 NCAA Division I-A football season. In its first season under head coach Bruce Arians, the team compiled a 4–7 record and was outscored by a total of 241 to 170. The team played its home games at Veterans Stadium and Franklin Field in Philadelphia. 

The team's statistical leaders included Tim Riordan with 1,732 passing yards, Paul Palmer with 628 rushing yards and 48 points scored, and Russell Carter with 482 receiving yards.

Schedule

References

Temple
Temple Owls football seasons
Temple Owls football